The Epson HX-20 (also known as the HC-20) was the first "true" laptop computer. It was invented in July 1980 by Yukio Yokozawa, who worked for Suwa Seikosha, a branch of Japanese company Seiko (now Seiko Epson), receiving a patent for the invention. It was announced in 1981 as the HC-20 in Japan, and was introduced by Epson in North America as the HX-20 at the 1981 COMDEX computer show in Las Vegas, where it drew significant attention for its portability. It had a mass-market release in July 1982, as the HC-20 in Japan and as the Epson HX-20 in North America. The size of an A4 notebook and weighing 1.6 kg, it was hailed by BusinessWeek magazine as the "fourth revolution in personal computing".

Features 

Epson advertised the HX-20 with a photograph and photo editing of the computer on two facing magazine pages with the headline "Actual size". Known colours of the machine are silver and cream, while some prototypes were dark grey. The HX-20 was supplied with a grey or brown carry case. An external acoustic coupler, the CX-20, was available for the HX-20, as was an external floppy disk drive, the TF-20, and an external speech synthesis Augmentative Communication Device (ACD), 'RealVoice'. Another extension was the serially connected  character video. It used a special protocol, EPSP, which was also used by the external floppy disk drive.
The battery life of the HX-20 was approximately  running BASIC and less using the microcassette, printer or RS-232. Data integrity could be preserved in the  range. Operating and charging it would tolerate .

The later, more popular TRS-80 Model 100 line, designed by Kyocera, owed much to the design of the HX-20.

Reception
BYTE in September 1983 wrote that the HX-20, available in the United States for about a year, had been unsuccessful because of the lack of software or accessories. The review noted that Epson had included the formerly  microcassette drive in the standard  configuration, as well as bundling a simple word processor. BYTE praised the printer as "nothing short of amazing", but criticized the lack of an operating system for cassette storage and said that compared to the TRS-80 Model 100's display, "the HX-20 looks primitive".

LCD 
The LCD is 120×32 pixels and is controlled by six μPD7227 LCD controller ICs each responsible for 40×16 pixels of the LCD. The μPD7227 uses a serial protocol and has two memory banks  for switching between rows 0-7 and 8-15. It features multiple modes, including "Write", "Read", "AND", "OR" and "Character". The "character" mode draws characters from a built-in character map.
Each bank is 40 bytes with bit 6 of the address determining the bank and even though the address can be up to 127, nothing will happen when trying to access data outside the banks. If the pointer action in a command is set to decrement and the pointer is at 0, the pointer will wrap to 127.

Monitor 

The Monitor program can be accessed via the main menu on startup by pressing 1, by typing the command "MON" in BASIC or by causing a trap, i.e. writing/reading to/from protected addresses or executing an illegal instruction.
In the case of a trap, "Trap!" will be displayed in the Monitor and the user can use it for debugging.

When entering Monitor it shows a prompt on the first line, "Trap!" on the second line (if entered via a trap) and the CPU registers as they were right before the Monitor was entered on the third and fourth lines. These registers are A (Accumulator A), B (Accumulator B), X (Index Register), C (Condition Code Register), S (Stack Pointer) and P (Program Counter).

Monitor can be used for reading and writing memory, modifying CPU registers, running code at specific addresses in memory, saving/loading memory to/from a plugin option, etc. This is very useful for debugging programs written in machine code in difference to programs written in the EPSON BASIC programming language.

Commands

Memory map 

ROM #0 and #1 are known as the I/O ROMs, handling system reset and providing functions for using the LCD, keyboard, clock, printer, speaker, serial communication, etc. The I/O ROMs are equivalent to the BIOS in modern PCs.
ROM #0 also contains the interrupt vector table at FFF0-FFFF. FFFE-FFFF determines what the program counter should be set to on power up or reset. In the standard set of ROMs for the HX-20, this value is E000, the start of ROM #0.

ROM #2 and #3 contains the BASIC interpreter. If the BASIC ROMs are removed from the motherboard, the BASIC option in the main menu will disappear, leaving only MONITOR. This is because ROM #3 contains a program header which is detected by the menu routines. This works the same for all user-created programs, except the program type is different.

The Expansion unit added up to 16 kByte of RAM and two ROM sockets. The latter could only be used by switching off the internal BASIC ROMS.

Similar Epson models 

 HC-80 (Japanese version of the PX-8)
 HC-88 (Japanese version of the PX-8)
 HX-40 (American version of the PX-4)
 HX-45 (American version of the PX-4)
 KX-1
 PX-16 (IBM PC compatible portable, cartridges compatible with PX-4)
 PX-4 (successor of the HX-20, with larger screen and CP/M compatible like the PX-8)
 PX-8 (Geneva)
 EHT-30, EHT-40

See also
 Epson ActionNote

References

External links 

Epson HX-20 documentation, photos and software
Epson's HX-20 manual and additional material
HX-20 utility and game programs
'HXTape' program to read and write tapes via a soundcard
old-computers.com article on the HX-20 
1983 Epson HX-20 computer., (evaluation) David H. Ahl., CREATIVE COMPUTING VOL. 9, NO. 3 / MARCH 1983 / PAGE 101    
vintage-computer.com article about the HX-20
https://www.youtube.com/watch?v=o-F_hL1bZsw  The World's First Laptop - Epson HX-20 / HC-20

HX-20
Early laptops
Japanese inventions
6809-based home computers